Coreospiridae is an extinct family of Paleozoic molluscs of uncertain position taxonomically. They might be snails (Gastropoda), Helcionelloida, or they might be Monoplacophora.

2005 taxonomy 
The taxonomy of the Gastropoda by Bouchet & Rocroi, 2005 categorizes Coreospiridae in the superfamily Scenelloidea within the 
Paleozoic molluscs of uncertain systematic position.

2006–2007 taxonomy 
According to P. Yu. Parkhaev,  the family Coreospiridae is in the family Helcionelloidea (Wenz, 1938) in the order Helcionelliformes (Golikov & Starobogatov, 1975) within the subclass Archaeobranchia (Parkhaev, 2001) in the class Helcionelloida (Peel, 1991).

Genera 
Genera in the family Coreospiridae include:
 Coreospira Saito, 1936 - type genus of the family Coreospiridae
 Latouchella
 Owenella Ulrich & Scofield, 1897
 Owenella antiquata (Whitfield, 1878) - synonym: Bellerophon antiquata Whitfield, 1878

References 

 Knight, J. B. (1947). Some new Cambrian bellerophont gastropods. Smithsonian Miscellaneous Collections. 106(17): 1−11, pls. 1−2